Andrzej Bikiewicz (born 13 October 1955) is a retired Polish football player and manager. During his career he exclusively played for and managed teams within the Tricity area.

Football

Bikiewicz started his career with Ogniwa Sopot, before signing his first professional contract with MRKS Gdańsk.	In 1975 he joined Bałtyk Gdynia, where he played a total of 70 games and scored 20 goals in his first spell with Bałtyk. In 1978 he joined Arka Gdynia, in what would be his most successful season of his playing career. Arka won the Polish Cup in 1979, beating Wisła Kraków 2-1 in the final. In total Bikiewicz played 68 games for Arka, scoring 20 goals in all competitions (with a minimum of 34 league games and 7 league goals). After Arka, he once again joined Bałtyk Gdynia, this time only managing 6 games and 1 goal for the club, before moving to Lechia Gdańsk for a season, where he played a total of 7 games scoring 1 goal.

After his playing career Bikiewicz moved into management. Firstly he had two spells with Arka Gdynia, in 1986-87 and 1989-90. After Arka his next managerial position was in 1997-98 with Lechia Gdańsk.

Honours
Arka Gdynia
Puchar Polski (1): 1979

References

1955 births
People from Łódź East County
Polish footballers
Polish football managers
Arka Gdynia players
Arka Gdynia managers
Lechia Gdańsk managers
Lechia Gdańsk players
Association football forwards
Living people